Amirtham is a 2006 Indian Tamil-language drama film produced, written and directed by K. Kannan, making his directorial debut. The film stars newcomer Ganesh and Navya Nair, with Girish Karnad, Anuradha Krishnamoorthy, Rajeev, Rekha, Yugendran and Madhura playing supporting roles. It was released on 10 February 2006.

Plot

In a village called Mukkudal, the devout Brahmin Ramaswamy Iyengar (Girish Karnad) is a poor temple priest living a peaceful life with his wife Rukkumani (Anuradha Krishnamoorthy) and his soft-spoken daughter Amirtha (Navya Nair). The villagers greatly respect Ramaswamy Iyengar for his goodness. In the same temple, Pasupathi Pillai (Rajeev) is a Nadaswaram exponent and a rich person, he has a good relationship with Ramaswamy Iyengar. He has a wife (Rekha), a son studying in the city and a daughter born to him and his wife's sister. Pasupathi Pillai's son Amirtham (Ganesh) returns to the village after completing his engineering degree. Amirtham is an outspoken atheist and rationalist. Thereafter, Amirtha falls in love with Amirtham while Amirtham's half-sister Sorna (Madhura) is killed by her sadist husband Veerayan (Yugendran).

Rukkumani then learns of her daughter's love with the Nadaswaram exponent's son Amirtham and she supports her daughter's love affair. Rukkumani even convinced Amirtham's mother to support their love. However, when Amritha declares his feelings to Amirtham, he rejects her proposals because he doesn't want to affect the friendship between his father and her father. Amirtham then leaves the village and returns in the city.

In the meantime, petroleum geologists find petroleum under the temple belt and the government ask the villagers to leave the village for oil drilling and extracting the petroleum in the village. The villagers oppose the move by the government and in the process, the police arrest Ramasamy Iyengar. Amirtham comes back to the village to protest against the demolition of the temple. In a fight between the villagers and the police, Amirtham is shot dead. Afterwards, the Supreme Court stops the demolition of the temple and forces the people to vacate the village. Pasupathi Pillai and his wife leave their place with a heavy heart but to their great surprise, Amirtha decides to go with them thus becoming their daughter.

Cast

Ganesh as Amirtham
Navya Nair as Amirtha
Girish Karnad as Ramaswamy Iyengar
Anuradha Krishnamoorthy as Rukkumani
Rajeev as Pasupathi Pillai
Rekha
Yugendran as Veerayan
Madhura as Sorna half-sister
Nizhalgal Ravi as Police Inspector
Ranjitha as Collector
Subhalekha Sudhakar as Sadagopan
Priyadarshini as Journalist

Production
K. Kannan, who was the dialogue writer of Vedham Pudhithu (1987), made his debut as director of this venture. The film will deal with the ever-existing divide between rationalism and theism. Navya Nair, heroine of Azhagiya Theeye (2004), signed to play an Iyengar girl opposite Ganesh, a new face. Girish Karnad (voice dubbed by Mohan Raman) played the role of a temple priest and carnatic musician Anuradha Krishnamurthy would make her big screen debut.

Soundtrack

The film score and the soundtrack were composed by Bhavatharini. The soundtrack, released in 2006, features 4 tracks with lyrics written by Piraisoodan, P. Vijay, Yugabharathi and Kiruthiya .

Reception
Balaji Balasubramaniam of bbthots.com said, "It brings up some serious issues in a different setting but fails to make build on the issues in an interesting manner". Indiaglitz stated, "Kannan has an idea and has pursued it without any compromise. That in itself deserves credit, and he has also made a good job of it. It is by no means a perfect film" and added that "Navya Nair is the scene-stealer". P. V. Sathish Kumar of nowrunning.com rated the film 3 out of 5 and wrote, "Be it the cast or the storyline or the direction everything is different and Kannan has shown his deftness in all these elements of filmmaking. He must be lauded for making a sincere attempt with an absorbing story". A reviewer of The Hindu said, "Kannan brings in the commercial element through duets and dream songs. His profound, thought-provoking dialogue in 'Vedam Pudhidhu' and now in 'Amirtham' will remain unforgettable for long. As a dialogue writer Kannan shines. But his story is bogged down by too many issues".

References

2006 films
2000s Tamil-language films
Indian drama films
Films about the caste system in India
2006 directorial debut films
2006 drama films
Films scored by Bhavatharini